Brocéliande is a French horror film written by Doug Headline and Benoît Lestang, directed by Doug Headline, and starring André Wilms, Alice Taglioni and Alexis Loret.

Plot

Chloe Severin, a student of archaeology in the first semester, is participating in an excavation under the direction of Professor Vernet. According to legend, the heavily wooded location, Brocéliande, is the burial site of King Arthur and the wizard Merlin. Soon after their arrival, a series of mysterious murders begins to thin the ranks of the participants, all victims brandishing wounds from Druids sickles. Upon pursuing the mystery and the excavation, Chloe encounters a very lively pagan cult and its horned priest.

Cast
 Elsa Kikoïne as Chloé Severin
 Cylia Malki as Iris
 Alice Taglioni as Léa
 Mathieu Simonet as Erwann
 Cédric Chevalme as Gilles
 Alexis Loret as Thomas
 André Wilms as Vernet
 Vernon Dobtcheff as Brennos
 Edwin Kruger as Druid
 Thierry Nzeutem as Morregane

Release
The film premiered on 2 November 2002 as part of the Semana de Cine Fantástico y de Terror de San Sebastián and was released in French cinemas on 8 January 2003.

Soundtrack
The soundtrack was composed by French musician Sarry Long.

References

External links 
 

2002 films
2000s French-language films
French horror films
2002 horror films
Films about cults
Films about neopaganism
Religious horror films
2000s French films